Sidney Youngelman, known as Sid, (December 1, 1931 – December 15, 1991) was an American football offensive lineman in the National Football League (NFL) for the San Francisco 49ers, Philadelphia Eagles, and the Cleveland Browns.  He also played in the American Football League for the New York Titans and Buffalo Bills.

Youngelman played college football at the University of Alabama.  Youngelman was Jewish.

1931 births
1991 deaths
American football offensive tackles
San Francisco 49ers players
Philadelphia Eagles players
Players of American football from Newark, New Jersey
Cleveland Browns players
New York Titans (AFL) players
Buffalo Bills players
Alabama Crimson Tide football players
Jewish American sportspeople
American Football League players
20th-century American Jews